The following lists events during 1995 in British Hong Kong.

Incumbents
 Monarch of the United Kingdom - Elizabeth II
 Governor - Chris Patten
 Chief Secretary - Anson Chan

Events

January
 22 January - The Miss Chinese International Pageant is held.
 1995 Lunar New Year Cup, an exhibition association football tournament takes place 31 January – 4 February.

February

March

April
 23 April - 14th Hong Kong Film Awards takes place.

May

June
 23–26 June - 1995 Women's World Open Squash Championship is held.

July

August

September
 17 September - 1995 Hong Kong legislative election is held.

October

November

December

Undated
 Pacific Access, a supply chain management and an engineering services company is founded.
 Weather Underground of Hong Kong website is established for weather and climate information.

See also
List of Hong Kong films of 1995

References

 
Years of the 20th century in Hong Kong
Hong Kong
Hong Kong
1995 in British Overseas Territories